King Of Hearts is the first solo album by former Fleetwood Mac guitarist and singer Rick Vito, released in 1992.

Track listing
All songs written by Rick Vito

"Walk Another Mile" – 3:53 +
"I’ll Never Leave This Love Alive" – 4:26
"Desireé" – 3:47
"Honey Love" – 4:31
"I Still Have My Guitar" – 4:38
"Poor Souls In Love" – 4:13 °
"Knock Me Down" – 4:35
"Walking With The Deco Man" – 4:12
"Intuition" – 4:17
"Two Hearts On Fire" – 4:13

Personnel
Rick Vito - guitars, vocals, bass
Stevie Nicks - vocals, backing vocals
Rick Prince - bass
Jerry Lee Domino - organ, keyboards
Charles "Mojo" Johnson - drums
Gary Mallaber - drums, backing vocals
Tony Reyes - backing vocals
Scott Smith - bass
Andy Kravitz - percussion
Donny Gerrard - backing vocals
Dexter Dickinson- backing vocals
Jimmy Jameson - backing vocals
Lance Quinn - keyboards
Scott "Omni" Adams - keyboards
Obie O'Brien - percussion

Production
Producers: Terry Manning & Rick Vito except + Rick Vito & ° Lance Quinn & Rick Vito
Engineer: Gary Mallaber, Terry Manning, Chris Brocius & Craig Fall
Assistant Engineers: Obie O’Brien
Mixing: Lance Quinn, Obie O’Brien, Brian Malouf, Phil "The Baker" Nicolo, Steve Pouliot
Mastering: Bernie Grundman
Programming: Steve Croes, Dan Garfield
Art Direction: Kosh Brooks Design
Design: Junker/Stephanie Sydney
Photography: Jeff Katz

Rick Vito albums
1992 debut albums